Scaphyglottis atwoodii is a species of epiphytic orchid from Costa Rica. It is known from only one location at Finca de Selva, 3 km east of Puerto Viejo de Sarapiquí.

Scaphyglottis atwoodii is an epiphytic herb with stems up to 20 cm long. Leaves are oblong to elliptical, up to 10 cm long. Flowers solitary or in small clusters. Sepals narrowly lancolate, up to 2 mm long. Petals are up to 6 mm long. Lip 3-lobed, the lateral lobes up to 2 mm long, the central lobe rhombic or flabellate, the tip bent upward.

References 

atwoodii
Orchids of Costa Rica